Konvict Muzik is a record label founded by R&B singer Akon. Other than Akon, popular artists such as T-Pain, Kardinal Offishall, Kat DeLuna, Red Cafe, Dolla and Verse Simmonds have signed in the past or are still present on the label. At the beginning of most Konvict Muzik artists' songs there is the sound of the clank of a jail cell, followed by Akon uttering "Konvict". Akon started his own label after the success of his debut album. Akon has signed a deal with Columbia Records and Epic Records for new artists signed to Konvict.
Fotemah Mba held the executive position of Vice President of A&R for the label.

Akon has signed Nigerian artists P-Square, Tuface, and Wizkid as representatives of his record label Konvict Muzik in Africa. He revealed this in December 2011 in Lagos at the unveiling of Cintron energy drink, which took place in footballer Jay Jay Okocha's club, Number 10.

Roster

Current artists
Akon
OG Boo Dirty
Demarco
 Sarkodie
Tone Tone
Tre Carter
 Tone Trump
 Jonn Hart
 Billy Blue
 Money Jay
 P-Square
 Verse Simmonds
 Ya Boy 
 Wizkid
 Young Swift
 Omega (singer) "El Fuerte" 
 Nic Rhodes

Former artists
 A-Wax
 Cyhi the Prynce
 Costa Titch (deceased)
 Colby O'Donis
 D Teck
 Dolla (deceased)
 French Montana
 Glowb
 Jeffree Star
 JQT
 Lady Gaga
 Miscellaneous
 Red Cafe
 S. Fresh
 T-Pain
 Kardinal Offishall
 Money Man
 Kat Deluna
Michael Jackson

Discography

References

https://mobile.ghanaweb.com/GhanaHomePage/entertainment/Sarkodie-was-signed-on-Konvict-Muzik-Akon-contradicts-earlier-statement-825712

External links

American record labels
Record labels established in 2005
Sony Music
Record labels established in 2006
Contemporary R&B record labels
Hip hop record labels
Vanity record labels
Akon
SRC Records